Ectrepopterus uruguayensis is a species of characin only known from streams in Uruguay. This species is the only known member of its genus.

References
 

Characidae
Monotypic fish genera
Fish described in 1943